SH8 can refer to:

 New Zealand State Highway 8
 Texas State Highway 8
 Oklahoma State Highway 8
 Idaho State Highway 8

See also
List of highways numbered 8